Santiago is an unincorporated community in Benton County, Missouri, United States.

A post office called Santiago was established in 1899, and remained in operation until 1904. The community's name commemorates the Siege of Santiago.

References

Unincorporated communities in Benton County, Missouri
Unincorporated communities in Missouri